The following is a list of the IRMA's number-one singles of 1989.

31 number ones
Most number ones: Jason Donovan (5)
Most weeks at number one (song): "Especially for You" - Kylie Minogue and Jason Donovan, "Eternal Flame" - The Bangles, "Swing the Mood Again" - Various Artists, "Don't Know Much" - Linda Ronstadt and Aaron Neville, "Do They Know It's Christmas" - Band Aid II (3 weeks)
Most weeks at number one (artist): Jason Donovan (8 weeks)

See also 
 1989 in music
 List of artists who reached number one in Ireland

1989 in Irish music
1989 record charts
1989